The Homer-Center High School serves grades 7-12, and is located just south of the district's elementary school on Wildcat Lane. Originally constructed in 1959,  at a cost of $2.1 million, the building underwent its second complete renovation from 2008-10.

The Homerdome
One of the facilities in the high school complex is the Homerdome, which is the school gymnasium. Constructed in 1959, the most notable feature is the seven lofty arches, each constructed out of 90 tons of concrete and steel, supporting the barrel-vault roof which is 40 feet tall at its highest point. The second most notable feature of the Homerdome is the large fiberglass/aluminum window, rehabilitated in 1985, this window has over 600 sections, making it 50 feet wide and 20 feet tall at its highest point. The only items remaining in the Homerdome since the 2008-10 renovation is two murals donated by the class of 2001 and the LED scoreboards, at this point, the floors were stripped to the bare concrete and replaced.

Athletics
Homer-Center is a member of the 10-school Heritage Conference which resides within the PIAA-District VI.:
 Baseball - Class AA
 Basketball - Class AA
 Cross Country - Class AA
 Football - Class AA
 Golf - Class AAAA
 Softball - Class A
 Track and field - Class AA
 Volleyball - Class A

Vocational Education
Students in grades 10-12 have the opportunity to attend the Indiana County Technology Center in White Township for part of their school day if they wish to obtain training in a specific area that the ICTC offers.

Academics
Credits required for graduation will begin to accumulate at the start of the ninth grade year.

Coursework Breakdown
 English - 4 Credits
 Social Studies - 4 Credits
 Math - 4 Credits
 Science - 3 Credits
 Arts and Humanities - 2 Credits
 Family/Consumer Sciences - 1/4 Credit
 Physical Education - 1 Credit, 2 Credits starting with the class of 2014
 Health/Wellness Project - 1/2 Credit when completed
 Graduation Project - 1/2 Credit when completed

Programs of Studies
There are three Courses of Study at HCHS 
 Academic
 Business Education
 Technology
 Indiana County Technology Center

Course Offerings
 English and Reading
 Modern Language - including Spanish I, II, III and IV and French I
 Family/Consumer Sciences - Including the required course in Grade 9
 Art
 Mathematics
 Science
 Music - Including Band and Chorus
 Social Studies
 Health and Wellness
 Physical Education
 Supplemental Courses - Including the Arts/Humanities Credit required courses
 Business Education
 Technology Education

Notable alumni
 Patricia Hilliard Robertson, NASA Astronaut
 Ben McAdoo, Former Head Coach, New York Giants
 Mya Zemlock, Author of Heartless

Awards and recognition
 Roxanne Rouse, an English Department faculty member,  was a semi-finalist for the 2005 Pennsylvania Teacher of the Year Award. Math teacher Mark Butler was a finalist for the 2007 Pennsylvania Teacher of the Year Award. 
 Suzanne Mazur, a Math Department faculty member was inducted into the Penn State Behrend Lions Athletic Hall of Fame in September 2007.

References

Public high schools in Pennsylvania
Public middle schools in Pennsylvania
Schools in Indiana County, Pennsylvania
1959 establishments in Pennsylvania